Edmon Ryan Mossbarger (June 5, 1905 — August 4, 1984), known professionally as Edmon Ryan, was an American theater, film, and television actor.

A native of Cecilia, Kentucky, he was the son of Isham Edward Mossbarger (1864–1936) and Pearl Shelton Mossbarger (1882–1976), He died in Louisville.

Selected filmography

 Crime Over London (1936) – Spider
 Strangers on Honeymoon (1936)
 Gangway (1937) – Red Mike
 Non-Stop New York (1937) – American Prosecutor (uncredited)
 Smash and Grab (1937) – Barman (uncredited)
 Oh Boy! (1938) – Butch
 Hey! Hey! USA (1938) – Ace Marco
 Murder in Soho (1939) – Spike
 The Nursemaid Who Disappeared (1939) – Paul Renseler (uncredited)
 The Dark Eyes of London (1939) – Lieutenant Patrick O'Reilly
 Battleground (1949) – Major (uncredited)
 Side Street (1949) – Victor Backett
 Mystery Street (1950) – James Joshua Harkley
 The Breaking Point (1950) – Rogers
 Three Secrets (1950) – Hardin
 Undercover Girl (1950) – Doc Holmes
 Highway 301 (1950) – Detective Sgt. Truscott / Narrator
 The Du Pont Story (1950) – Lammot du Pont – the elder
 Storm Warning (1951) – Trailer's Hooded Narrator (uncredited)
 Sugarfoot (1951) – Opening Off Screen Narrator (voice, uncredited)
 The Guy Who Came Back (1951) – Joe Demarcus
 Go Man Go (1954) – Zack Leader
 Knights of the Queen (1954)
 Le avventure dei tre moschettieri (1957)
 La spada imbattibile (1957)
 Le imprese di una spada leggendaria (1958)
 Good Day for a Hanging (1959) – William P. Selby, Attorney
 Two for the Seesaw (1962) – Frank Taubman
 A Global Affair (1964) – Gavin
 A House Is Not a Home (1964) – Sam
 The Americanization of Emily (1964) – Adm. Hoyle
 The Playground (1965) – Jason Porter
 Banning (1967) – Stuart Warren
 Topaz (1969) – Mckittreck
 Tora! Tora! Tora! (1970) – Rear Admiral Patrick NL Bellinger (final film role)

References

External links

1905 births
1984 deaths
American male stage actors
American male film actors
20th-century American male actors
People from Hardin County, Kentucky
Male actors from Kentucky